Silovs is a surname. Notable people with the surname include:

 Juris Silovs (athlete) (1950–2018), Soviet sprinter
 Juris Silovs (cyclist) (born 1973), Latvian cyclist
 Haralds Silovs (born 1986), Latvian short track and long track speed skater